A purchase and sale agreement (PSA) is an agreement between a buyer and a seller of real estate property, company stock, or other assets.

The person, company, or other legal entity acquiring, receiving, and purchasing the property, stock, or other assets is referred to as the buyer and the entity disposing, conveying, and selling the assets is referred to as the seller. A PSA sets out the various rights and obligations of both the buyer and seller, and might also require other documents be executed and recorded in the public records, such as an assignment, deed of trust, or farmout agreement.

In the oil and natural gas industries, a PSA is the primary legal contract by which companies exchange oil and gas assets (including stock in an oil and gas business entity) for cash, debt, stock, or other assets.

References

Petroleum production
Sales
Land use